Aayiram Kalathu Payir is a 1963 Indian Tamil-language drama film directed by T. S. Durairaj. The film stars Kaka Radhakrishnan and Radhabhai.

Plot

Cast 
The following list is adapted from the book Thiraikalanjiyam part 2.
Kaka Radhakrishnan
A. V. M. Rajan
Vairam Krishnamurthi
K. Kannan
Nanjil Natarajan
T. M. Kannappan
M. Subbaraman
Radhabhai
K. G. Shanthi
P. Leela
Nirmaladevi

Production 
The film was produced and directed by T. S. Durairaj under the banner Master Pictures. Pulavar Nagashanmugam wrote the screenplay and dialogues to the story written by the story department of Master Pictures.

Soundtrack 
Music was composed by S. M. Subbaiah Naidu while the lyrics were penned by Kannadasan and Chidambaram Sundaram Pillai.

Reception 
T. M. Ramachandran of Sport and Pastime wrote that Dorairaj deserved to be congratulated for making a film with newcomers and giving them an opportunity to show their talent.

References

External links 
 

1960s Tamil-language films
1963 drama films
1963 films
Films scored by S. M. Subbaiah Naidu
Indian drama films